Today's Sunbeam was a daily newspaper in Salem, New Jersey, United States. Founded in 1819, it ceased publication in 2012 when it merged with its sister papers the Gloucester County Times and The News of Cumberland County to form the South Jersey Times.

History
The paper was founded in 1819 as the Salem Messenger, serving only the town of Salem, New Jersey. The name was later changed to the Salem Sunbeam. In 1972 the Salem Sunbeam merged with four other local papers, Woodstown Monitor-Register, Penns Grove Sun, Pennsville Progress, and  Salem Standard and Jerseyman, to form a new paper covering Salem County. The new paper was called the Sunbeam, later Today's Sunbeam. The paper's chief competitors were The Philadelphia Inquirer across the Delaware River in Pennsylvania, and the Courier-Post and Burlington County Times in South Jersey. MediaNews Group acquired Today's Sunbeam in 1990. Advance Publications bought MediaNews' New Jersey and Pennsylvania newspapers in 2000. In 2012, the Sunbeam was merged with two other Advance Publications papers, Gloucester County Times and The News of Cumberland County, to form the South Jersey Times.

References

External links
Today's Sunbeam contacts list & general information

Advance Publications
Defunct newspapers published in New Jersey
Newspapers published in New Jersey
Publications disestablished in 2012
Publications established in 1819
Salem County, New Jersey